PRSD may refer to:

The Social Democrat Radical Party in Chile, also known as Partido Radical Socialdemócrata

Education
Peace River School Division in Alberta, Canada
Pearl River School District in Pearl River, New York, USA
Pentucket Regional School District in West Newbury, Massachusetts, USA
Pinelands Regional School District in Tuckerton, New Jersey, USA
Pine-Richland School District in Richland Township, Pennsylvania, USA
 PTSD in error, qwerty keyboard